Richard Thomas Dutton Budworth (17 October 1867 – 7 December 1937) was an English rugby union forward who played club rugby for Blackheath and international rugby for England. In 1890 Budworth became one of the original members of the Barbarians Football Club.

Personal history
Budworth was born in 1867 in Greensted, Essex, to Philip John Budworth and Annie Emily Thomas.  He was educated at Christ College, Brecon, before matriculating to Magdalen College, Oxford. Upon leaving university he taught at Lancing College in West Sussex and then between 1898 and 1907 at Clifton College. He eventually settled in the North of England becoming headmaster of Durham School (1907 to 1932). During his teaching profession Budworth entered the priesthood and was ordained in 1902, before becoming a canon at Durham Cathedral.

Rugby career
Budworth first came to note as a rugby player when he represented Oxford University while studying at Magdalen College. He played in three Varsity Matches, from 1887 to 1889 winning his sporting 'Blues'. During the 1889/90 season and now playing for Blackheath, Budworth was first selected for the England national team, playing in the first English game of the 1890 Home Nations Championship. The English team, although talented, was fairly inexperienced after they missed the previous two Championships. In windy and snowy conditions, England lost to Wales at Crown Flatt in Dewsbury. Budworth then missed the two remaining games of the Championship, but was reselected for the 1891 Championship for the encounters with Wales and Scotland. After away victories over Wales and then Ireland, the later of which Budworth missed, the England team faced the Scottish in the tournament decider. Despite great early performances from the pack, against Scotland the forwards were routed and the Scottish won in a convincing manner. Budworth never represented his country again.

As well as his international career, Budworth was also of note in the field of rugby football as he was one of the original members of the invitational touring team, the Barbarians. He played in their inaugural match at Hartlepool in 1890 and went on to represent the side on five occasions, competing in his last match in 1892 against the Corinthians.

Bibliography

References

1867 births
1937 deaths
English rugby union players
England international rugby union players
Rugby union forwards
Barbarian F.C. players
Blackheath F.C. players
London Welsh RFC players
People from Epping Forest District
Oxford University RFC players
People educated at Christ College, Brecon
Alumni of Magdalen College, Oxford
20th-century English Anglican priests
Schoolteachers from Essex
Heads of schools in England
Rugby union players from Essex